

Protozoa

New taxa

Plants

Ferns and fern allies

Gymnosperms

Gymnosperm research
An amplified whole plant reconstruction of the Ypresian Princeton chert pine Pinus arnoldii, expanding the diagnosis to include P. similkameenensis (Miller, 1973) foliage and wood plus unnamed pollens cones found in attachment to the P. arnoldii ovulate cones is published by Klymiuk, Stockey, & Rothwell.

Angiosperms

Nematoda

Lobopods

Vetulicolians

Molluscs

Arthropods

Fishes

Amphibians

Newly named lepospondyls

Newly named temnospondyls

Newly named lissamphibians

Basal reptiles

Newly named captorhinids

Newly named basal diapsids

Newly named ichthyosaurs

Lepidosauromorphs

Newly named saurosphargids

Newly named sauropterygians

Newly named lizards

Newly named snakes

Turtles

Newly named turtles

Archosauromorphs

Newly named basal archosauromorphs

Archosaurs

Synapsids

Newly named non-mammalian synapsids

Mammals

Footnotes

Complete author list
As science becomes more collaborative, papers with large numbers of authors are becoming more common. To prevent the deformation of the tables, these footnotes list the contributors to papers that erect new genera and have many authors.

References

 
2010s in paleontology